The Turkmenistan Ice Hockey Federation (TŞHF) is the governing body of ice hockey in Turkmenistan.

History
In 2014, at the IIHF congress in Minsk, Belarus, an official application was submitted for the entry of the National Hockey Center of Turkmenistan into the International Ice Hockey Federation (IIHF). On 15 May 2015, the application of Turkmenistan was approved, the National Winter Sports Center of Turkmenistan became the 74th member of the IIHF. Turkmenistan became the third former Soviet Republic from Central Asia to join the IIHF after Kazakhstan and Kyrgyzstan.

Presidents
Begench Patyshakulievich Rejepov (1 March 2012–30 June 2015)
Agajan Hudayberdiyev (30 June 2015–15 January 2017)
Jora Hudayberdiyev (15 January 2017–present)

Leagues
The Turkmenistan Ice Hockey Championship consisting of 8 teams is held annually. The first championship was held in 2014. Competitions are held in two rounds of 28 games each. The teams that took from the first to the fourth places in the championship will compete for the Turkmenistan Ice Hockey Cup.

Playing levels
Turkmenistan Championship

Ice hockey venues
In 2006, Bouygues completed the construction of the first Ice Palace in Turkmenistan. At the present moment, hockey teams from Ashgabat and the Turkmenistan national team hold games and trainings in the palace.

In 2011, a second ice facility, the Winter Sports Complex Ashgabat, was opened in Turkmenistan at a cost of 134.4 million euros. The total area of the new sports facility is 107 thousand square meters. In the center of the palace, there is an ice arena measuring 60 by 30 meters. One of the largest hockey arenas in the Commonwealth of Independent States.

National teams
Men's national team

Participation by year
2017

Turkmenistan did not enter in any 2017 IIHF World Championship tournaments.

2018

Note: The Turkmenistan under-20 national team was supposed to make its debut at the 2018 IIHF World U20 Championship Division III Qualification tournament, but withdrew prior to the tournament starting.

2019

2022

2023

References

External links
IIHF profile
Ministry of Sport and Youth policy Turkmenistan profile

Turkmenistan
Ice hockey in Turkmenistan
Turkmenistan
Ice hockey